Supreme Leader can refer to:
 a supreme leader in a specific context

Political 
 Apu Mallku, Supreme Leader title of the Aymara people
 Cihuacoatl (position), a supreme leader in the Aztec Empire

 Supreme Leader of Iran, the highest-ranking political and religious authority in the constitution of the Islamic Republic of Iran
 Supreme Leader of North Korea, a formal title given to the incumbent General Secretary of the Workers' Party of Korea and Chairman of the State Affairs Commission, the highest-ranking position of ruling party and government.

Fictional 
 Supreme Leader (Star Wars), a title for the fictional Star Wars character Asajj Ventress.
 Supreme Leader Snoke, a fictional villain from the Star Wars franchise
 Supreme Leader Kylo Ren, a fictional character from the Star Wars franchise

Film 

 El jefe máximo (The Supreme Leader) film

See also
 Maximum Leader (disambiguation)
 Paramount leader
Brother Leader
 Generalissimo (disambiguation)